The  is a skyscraper located in Mito, Ibaraki Prefecture, Japan. Construction of the 120-metre, 25-storey skyscraper was finished in 2004.

External links
  

Government buildings completed in 2004
Government buildings in Japan
Buildings and structures in Ibaraki Prefecture
Skyscraper office buildings in Japan
2004 establishments in Japan
Mito, Ibaraki